Die Legende von Paul und Paula (English: The Legend of Paul and Paula) is a 1973 tragicomic East German film directed by Heiner Carow. A novel by Ulrich Plenzdorf named Die Legende vom Glück ohne Ende was based on this film.

The film was extremely popular on release and drew 3,294,985 viewers (the GDR had a population at the time of around 17 million). However, due to the film's political overtones it was almost not released. East German leader Erich Honecker personally decided to allow it to be shown. Today it is one of the best-known East German films.

Plot summary

Paul is a minor bureaucrat in East Berlin, where he lives with his wife and their son in a modern high-rise apartment building. While he is well educated and professionally ambitious, he is generally bored with his life. He cannot relate to his unsophisticated wife, who is repeatedly unfaithful, even bringing men home to their apartment when Paul is away. Paula, a grocery store cashier and single mother of two, lives in a run-down, prewar building directly across from Paul's modern high-rise. Having thrown out her philandering live-in lover (and father of her younger child), she is seeking more happiness in her tedious life.

Paul and Paula meet at a nightclub and instantly connect. Paula falls in love with Paul and pursues him passionately. He desires her, but is reluctant to endanger his career and his marriage. When one of Paula's children is killed in an accident, Paul realizes that Paula is more important than his career and his marriage, but she is so crushed by her loss that she rejects him. Seeking security, she seriously contemplates marriage with an older, successful but dull businessman, and Paul must go to great lengths to win Paula back. Ultimately, he succeeds and they move in together, but she dies giving birth to their child.

Trivia

The film made the band Puhdys a household name in East Germany. The band performs four songs in the film, all of which drew heavily upon specific western pop songs.
The film's enduring popularity led to a stretch of waterfront on the Rummelsburger See (Rummelsburg Lake) in Berlin-Lichtenberg, near where the boat scene was filmed, to be renamed Paul und Paula-Ufer (Paul And Paula Shore).
Paul's new apartment was on the third floor of Singerstraße 51 in Friedrichshain. Paula's apartment across the street was demolished, as shown in the film. A supermarket now occupies part of the site.
Berlin Ostbahnhof can briefly be seen in some of the outdoor scenes, as it is only a short distance from the Singerstraße. The supermarket where Paula worked is located at what was then Leninplatz (now Platz der Vereinten Nationen).
Former German chancellor Angela Merkel revealed this movie to be her favorite.

Cast 
 Angelica Domröse - Paula (Adam)
 Winfried Glatzeder - Paul
 Heidemarie Wenzel - Die Schöne (Ines)
 Fred Delmare - Reifen-Saft
 Rolf Ludwig - Professor
  - Frau des Schießbudenbesitzers
  - Schießbudenbesitzer
  - Kollege Schmidt 
  - Kumpel

References

External links

DEFA summary (in English)

1973 films
Films set in Berlin
East German films
1970s German-language films
Films directed by Heiner Carow
Babelsberg Studio films